Hawaii Five-O is a police procedural television series created by Leonard Freeman for the CBS television network. Starring Jack Lord, the series premiered on September 20, 1968, and ended after 12 seasons on April 4, 1980, during which time 282 episodes were produced and broadcast. The series covers a fictional special state task force for the state of Hawaii led by Detective Steve McGarrett (Jack Lord). 

To date, all 12 seasons have been released on DVD in Region 1, as well as the first seven seasons for Regions 2 and 4.

Series overview

Episodes

Season 1 (1968–69)

Season 2 (1969–70)

Season 3 (1970–71)

Season 4 (1971–72)

Season 5 (1972–73)

Season 6 (1973–74) 

Creator and executive producer Leonard Freeman died during this season.

Season 7 (1974–75)

Season 8 (1975–76)

Season 9 (1976–77)

Season 10 (1977–78)

Season 11 (1978–79)

Season 12 (1979–80)

References

External links

 
Lists of American crime drama television series episodes